Identity disorder may refer to:

Identity disorder: a state listed in the Diagnostic and Statistical Manual of Mental Disorders
Identity crisis
Existential crisis
Personality disorder